James Sunderland (born 6 June 1970) is a British politician and former military officer who is currently serving as the member of Parliament (MP) for Bracknell since 2019. He is a member of the Conservative Party.

Early and personal life
Sunderland was educated at Royal Grammar School, Guildford, before earning a bachelor’s degree with honours at the University of Birmingham. He then earned a master’s degree from King’s College London before attending the Defence Academy.

He was commissioned into the British Army from the Royal Military Academy at Sandhurst in 1993 and served for 26 years before retiring in November 2019 with the rank of Colonel. 

Sunderland is married.

Political career
In November 2019, Sunderland stood as the Conservative parliamentary candidate for Bracknell and was selected. He won the seat at the 2019 general election, replacing Phillip Lee, who had defected from the Conservatives to the Liberal Democrats.

Since becoming an MP Sunderland has become a member of the following All-Party Parliamentary Groups:
 Chair: Armed Forces Covenant, Motorsport, Veterans
 Vice-Chair: British Overseas Territories, South Atlantic, South Western Railway, Special Needs Education, Turks and Caicos Islands
 Member: Armed Forces, Homelessness, International Trade, Loan Charge (IR35), Motor Neurone Disease, Western Rail Link to London Heathrow.

Following an interim report on the connections between colonialism and properties now in the care of the National Trust, including links with historic slavery, Sunderland was among the signatories of a letter to The Telegraph in November 2020 from the "Common Sense Group" of Conservative Parliamentarians. The letter accused the National Trust of being "coloured by cultural Marxist dogma, colloquially known as the 'woke agenda'".

In March 2021 Sunderland was elected the chairman of the Armed Forces Bill Select Committee.

He responded to claims that the Boundary Commission charged with redistricting the Bracknell Constituency purposefully redrew the maps to aid Conservatives by saying "I am comfortable that fairness has been employed and that the fundamental principles that underpin it have been robustly honoured."

In the Government reshuffle of September 2021, Sunderland received his first official appointment, as a parliamentary private secretary (PPS) to the ministerial team at the Ministry of Defence. On 13 June 2022, he was moved to the role of PPS to George Eustice, the secretary of state for environment, food and rural affairs. He resigned from this position on 6 July 2022, in protest at Boris Johnson's conduct in the Chris Pincher scandal.

References

External links

1970 births
Living people
People educated at Royal Grammar School, Guildford
Alumni of the University of Birmingham
Alumni of King's College London
UK MPs 2019–present
Conservative Party (UK) MPs for English constituencies
People from Bracknell